Letham are a Scottish football club from the Letham area in the northwest of Perth. They are members of the East Region of the Scottish Junior Football Association and currently play in the Midlands Football League.

History

Letham were formed in 1960 as an amateur club, playing in the Perthshire Amateur Football Association. They joined the Scottish Junior Football Association in 2021. Their home ground is Seven Acres. The club has a longstanding history in youth football and currently runs around twenty teams in various age groups.

References

Football clubs in Scotland
Scottish Junior Football Association clubs
Association football clubs established in 1960
Football clubs in Perth and Kinross
1960 establishments in Scotland
Sport in Perth, Scotland